Joseph Ivor Silk FRS (born 3 December 1942) is a British-American  astrophysicist. He was the Savilian Chair of Astronomy at the University of Oxford from 1999 to September 2011.

He is an Emeritus Fellow of New College, Oxford and a Fellow of the Royal Society (elected May 1999). He was awarded the 2011 Balzan Prize for his works on the early Universe. Silk has given more than two hundred invited conference lectures, primarily on galaxy formation and cosmology.

Biography
He was educated at Tottenham County School (1954–1960) and went on to study Mathematics at the University of Cambridge (1960–1963). He obtained his PhD in Astronomy from Harvard in 1968. Silk took up his first post at Berkeley in 1970, and the Chair in Astronomy in 1978. Following a career of nearly 30 years there, Silk returned to the UK in 1999 to take up the Savilian Chair of Astronomy at the University of Oxford. He is currently Professor of Physics at the Institut d'astrophysique de Paris, Université Pierre et Marie Curie, Homewood Professor of Physics and Astronomy at Johns Hopkins University (since in 2010), and Professor of Astronomy at Gresham College from 2015 to 2019.

Silk damping

The structure of the cosmic microwave background anisotropies is principally determined by two effects: acoustic oscillations and diffusion damping. The latter is also called collisionless or Silk damping after Joseph Silk.

Honors and awards

 1972 and 1974 Sloan Research Fellow
 1975: Guggenheim Fellow
 1995: Fellow of the American Physical Society
 1999: Fellow of the Royal Society
 2007: Inclusion in the American Academy of Arts and Sciences
 2008: Gold Medal of the Royal Astronomical Society
 2011: Balzan Prize for his works on the early Universe
 2014: Member of the US National Academy of Sciences
 2018: Henry Norris Russell Lectureship
 2019: Gruber Prize in Cosmology with Nicholas Kaiser  "for their seminal contributions to the theory of cosmological structure formation and probes of dark matter"
2020: Fellow of the American Astronomical Society
2020: Nick Kylafis Lecturer

Publications

Silk has over 900 publications, nearly 200 as first author, of which 3 have been cited over 1000 times, over 50 have been published in Nature and 12 in Science.

In 2011, Silk delivered a talk, "The Creation of the Universe," at the first Starmus Festival in the Canary Islands. The talk was subsequently published in the book Starmus: 50 Years of Man in Space.

Books by Joseph Silk
The Infinite Cosmos, Oxford University Press, 2006, 
On the Shores of the Unknown: A Short History of the Universe, Cambridge University Press, 2005, Google Link
The Big Bang, W.H. Freeman, 2005, 
Cosmic Enigmas, Springer, 1994, Google Link

References

External links

Introduction videos to Professor Silk and his work, upon his appointment to Gresham College in 2015
Joseph Silk International Balzan Prize Foundation

Living people
20th-century American astronomers
Harvard University alumni
Academic staff of the University of Paris
University of California, Berkeley faculty
Fellows of New College, Oxford
Professors of Gresham College
Recipients of the Gold Medal of the Royal Astronomical Society
20th-century British astronomers
Fellows of the Royal Society
1942 births
Savilian Professors of Astronomy
Members of the United States National Academy of Sciences
21st-century American politicians
Sloan Research Fellows
People from Tottenham
Scientists from London
Fellows of the American Astronomical Society
21st-century British astronomers